Punta Sommeiller (in Italian) or Pointe Sommeiller (in  French) is a mountain of the Province of Turin, Italy and of Savoie, France. It lies in the Cottian Alps range.

Etymology
The old name of the mountain was Rognosa di Galambra, which derived from the secondary valley of Galambra (a tributary of Dora Riparia). It was then renamed by the geologist Martino Baretti, author of the first documented ascent to the summit, in order to avoid confusions with two neighboring "Rognosa"s, Rognosa d'Etiache and Rognosa del Sestriere. The new name was chosen to honour Germain Sommeiller, the civil engineer which directed the construction of the Fréjus Rail Tunnel between Savoy and Piedmont.

Geography 

In the French subdivision of western Alps it belongs to the Massif du Mont-Cenis while in the SOIUSA (International Standardized Mountain Subdivision of the Alps) it is part of the mountain group called "gruppo d'Ambin" (Italian) or "groupe d'Ambin" (French).

Administratively the mountain is divided between the Italian comunes of Bardonecchia (SW face) and Exilles (SE face) and the French commune of Bramans (N face).

A geodetic point of the Italian Military Geographic Institute is defined on the top of the mountain.

Access to the summit 

The easiest route for the summit starts from passo Settentrionale dei Fourneaux (3,159 m, which connects Exilles and Bardonecchia), then follows the south ridge of the mountain.

Mountain huts 
 Rifugio Scarfiotti (2,165 m - Bardonecchia)
 Rifugio Levi Molinari (1,850 m - Exilles)
 Bivacco Sigot (2,910 m - Exilles)
 Refuge d'Ambin (2,270 m - Bramans)

References

Maps
 Italian official cartography (Istituto Geografico Militare - IGM); on-line version: www.pcn.minambiente.it
 French  official cartography (Institut géographique national - IGN); on-line version:  www.geoportail.fr
 I.G.C. (Istituto Geografico Centrale) - Carta dei sentieri e dei rifugi scala 1:50.000 n. 1 Valli di Susa Chisone e Germanasca e 1:25.000 n. 104 Bardonecchia Monte Thabor Sauze d'Oulx

External links 
 Punta Sommeiller: 360° panoramic image from the summit on pano.ica-net.it

Mountains of the Alps
Mountains of Savoie
Mountains of Piedmont
Alpine three-thousanders
France–Italy border
International mountains of Europe
Mountains partially in France
Mountains partially in Italy
Three-thousanders of France
Three-thousanders of Italy